Diphosphoglyceric acid may refer to:

 1,3-Diphosphoglyceric acid
 2,3-Diphosphoglyceric acid